The 1975–76 Soviet Cup was the 17th edition of the Soviet Cup ice hockey tournament. Dynamo Moscow won the cup for the third time in their history. The cup was divided into four groups, with the top team in each group (top two in Group 2) advancing to the playoffs. Krylya Sovetov Moscow, Spartak Moscow, and CSKA Moscow received byes until the playoffs.

Group phase

Group 1

Group 2

Group 3

Group 4

Playoffs

Quarterfinals

Semifinals

Finale

External links 
 Tournament on hockeyarchives.info
 Tournament on hockeyarchives.ru

Cup
Soviet Cup (ice hockey) seasons